Rodd Redwing (August 24, 1904 – May 29, 1971) was born Webb Richardson on August 24, 1904 in Tennessee, USA. His father, Ulysses William Richardson (b. 1873), was Black and was an elevator man from Tennessee.  His mother, Lillian Webb (b. 1878), was also Black and worked as a manicurist and hairdresser. Lillian divorced her husband William in 1920. Their son Webb moved to New York to pursue a career in acting and appeared in the 1929 musical "Malinda" in Greenwich Village with a cast of African American performers. Webb later changed his birthname to Redwing, adopted a Native American identity, and changed his birthplace to New York City. Some sources reported that he used the Hindu-sounding name Roderick Rajpurkaii Jr. and said his father was a Brahmin mind reader from India.

Biography
Redwing was one of the top gun, knife, tomahawk, and whip instructors in Hollywood. After claiming that he began in films in Cecil B. DeMille’s 1931 The Squaw Man (although no cast list shows that he acted in that movie), Redwing soon became a gun-handling coach to Alan Ladd, Ronald Reagan, Burt Lancaster, Glenn Ford, Richard Widmark, Anthony Quinn, Charlton Heston, Dean Martin, Fred MacMurray and many other actors. He performed Alan Ladd's fancy gunspinning seen in the film Shane during the climatic showdown. 

Between 1951 and 1967, Redwing appeared in more than a dozen television programs, including a guest appearance on CBS's celebrity quiz show, What's My Line?

In eight episodes of the television series The Life and Legend of Wyatt Earp, Redwing appeared in the part of "Mr. Brother," a Cheyenne friend and informer of deputy Marshal Wyatt Earp.

Death
After filming his part in The Red Sun, Redwing died at the age of 66. On a flight from Spain to Los Angeles he suffered a heart attack and died 35 minutes later, just before the plane landed.  The urn containing his ashes was buried in Hollywood Forever Cemetery.

Film Credits

 White Hunter (1936) - Farid (uncredited)
 Son of Fury: The Story of Benjamin Blake (1942) - Native (uncredited)
 When Johnny Comes Marching Home (1942) - Egyptian Clerk (uncredited)
 Daredevils of the West (1943) - Indian (uncredited)
 Frontier Fury (1943) - Captured Indian (uncredited)
 The Story of Dr. Wassell (1944) - Javanese Orderly (uncredited)
 Sonora Stagecoach (1944) - Indian (uncredited)
 Rainbow Island (1944) - Queen's Guard (uncredited)
 Objective, Burma! (1945) - Sgt. Chattu (uncredited)
 Out of the Depths (1945) - Mike Rawhide
 The Scarlet Horseman (1946) - Comanche Warrior (uncredited)
 Singin' in the Corn (1946) - Indian Brave
 Unconquered (1947) - Indian (uncredited)
 The Last Round-Up (1947) - Louie (uncredited)
 Intrigue (1947) - Spy in Editor's Office (uncredited)
 Key Largo (1948) - John Osceola (uncredited)
 Song of India (1949) - Kumari (uncredited)
 We Were Strangers (1949) - (uncredited)
 Riders of the Pony Express (1949) - Bearclaw - Henchman 
 Laramie (1949) - Indian Lookout (uncredited)
 Rope of Sand (1949) - Oscar - Waiter (uncredited)
 Apache Chief (1949) - Tewa
 Samson and Delilah (1949) - Temple Spectator (uncredited)
 Cargo to Capetown (1950) - Native Cab Driver (uncredited)
 Kim (1950) - Creighton's Servant (uncredited)
 The Redhead and the Cowboy (1951) - Betien - Indian Guard (uncredited)
 Little Big Horn (1951) - Cpl. Arika
 Thunder in the East (1951) - Hassam (uncredited)
 Buffalo Bill in Tomahawk Territory (1952) - Running Deer 
 Rancho Notorious (1952) - Rio
 Hellgate (1952) - Pima (uncredited)
 Son of Geronimo (1952) - Porico, Son of Geronimo
 The Pathfinder (1952) - Chief Arrowhead
 Winning of the West (1953) - Pete Littlewolf (uncredited)
 Last of the Comanches (1953) - Indian (uncredited)
 Conquest of Cochise (1953) - Red Knife
 Saginaw Trail (1953) - Huron Chief (uncredited)
 Flight to Tangier (1953) - Police Orderly 
 Creature From the Black Lagoon (1954) - Luis - Expedition Foreman (uncredited)
 The Naked Jungle (1954) - Indian (uncredited)
 Gunfighters of the Northwest (1954) - Bear Tooth
 Elephant Walk (1954) - Servant (uncredited)
 Cattle Queen of Montana (1954) - Powhani
 The Twinkle in God's Eye (1955) - Indian (uncredited)
 The Treasure of Pancho Villa (1955) - Yaqui Tracker (uncredited)
 Jaguar (1956) - Porter #1
 The Ten Commandments (1956) - Taskmaster / Hebrew at Golden Calf
 The Mole People (1956) - Nazar
 Copper Sky (1957) - Indian (uncredited)
 The Sad Sack (1957) - Bartender (uncredited)
 The Flame Barrier (1958) - Waumi
 Heller in Pink Tights (1960) - Indian (uncredited)
 Flaming Star (1960) - Indian Warrior
 One-Eyed Jacks (1961)
 Sergeants 3 (1962) - Irregular
 4 for Texas (1963) - Indian (uncredited)
 The Virginian (1964 episode "The Intruders") - Black Feather's Brave
 Apache Uprising (1965) - Archie Whitewater
 Johnny Reno (1966) - Indian Brave
 The Shakiest Gun in the West (1968) - White Buffalo (uncredited)
 Shalako (1968) - Chato's Father
 Charro! (1969) - Lige
 Red Sun (1971)

References

External links

1904 births
1972 deaths
American male film actors
Burials at Hollywood Forever Cemetery
Male actors from Tennessee
20th-century American male actors